Urs is a masculine given name. From the Latin name Ursus, the name means "bear". It is a popular name in German-speaking Switzerland due to the historical veneration of Saint Ursus in Switzerland.

Notable people with the name include:

Urs Allemann (born 1948), Swiss writer and journalist
Urs App (born 1949), Swiss orientalist
Urs Bühler (born 1971), Swiss tenor
Urs Egger (1953–2020), Swiss film and television director
Urs Fischer (born 1973), Swiss artist
Urs Freuler (born 1958), Swiss former cyclist
Urs Noel Glutz von Blotzheim (born 1932), Swiss ornithologist
Urs Graf (1485–after 1529), Swiss painter and printmaker
Urs Imboden (born 1975), Swiss-Moldovan alpine skier
Urs Hölzle, Swiss software engineer and technology executive
Urs Kälin (born 1966), Swiss former alpine skier
Urs Lehmann (born 1969), Swiss former alpine skier
Urs Leimgruber (born 1952), Swiss saxophonist
Urs Lüthi (born 1947), Swiss artist
Urs Meier (born 1959), Swiss football referee
Urs A. Meyer (born 1938), Swiss physician and clinical pharmacologist
Urs Odermatt (born 1955), Swiss film director and author
Urs Räber (born 1958), Swiss former alpine skier
Urs Rechn (born 1978), German actor
Urs Rohner (born 1959), Swiss lawyer, businessman and banker
Urs Schwarzenbach (born 1948), Swiss financier
Urs Widmer (1938–2014), Swiss author
Urs Zimmermann (born 1959), Swiss former cyclist
Hans Urs von Balthasar (1905–1988), Swiss theologian

See also 
Bjorn, name also meaning bear

Masculine given names